Norwegian county road 413 (Fv413) is a Norwegian county road in Agder county, Norway. The northern junction at Dølemo connects with the Norwegian National Road 41. Near the northern end of the road, the Norwegian County Road 272 which heads north into the Tovdal valley. The southern junction joins the Norwegian County Road 42 just west of the village of Mykland. The road runs mostly through a rural forested area during its entire length.

References

413
Road transport in Agder